Abdul-Yakuni Iddi (born 25 June 1986, in Salaga) is a Ghanaian footballer. He currently plays as an offensive midfielder for Malderen in the Belgian provincial leagues.

Career 
Iddi began his career by Feyenoord Ghana and joined Feyenoord Rotterdam. He played in the youth from Feyenoord, then he was loan to K.V. Mechelen, shoots four goal in 25 games and after the season was sold from KV Mechelen.

Statistics

References
K.V. Mechelen bio
cbs3.com - Player Stats - Abdul-Yakuni Iddi

1986 births
Living people
Ghanaian footballers
West African Football Academy players
K.V. Mechelen players
Oud-Heverlee Leuven players
Belgian Pro League players
Challenger Pro League players
Ghanaian expatriate sportspeople in Belgium
Association football midfielders